The Yodokō Guest House was built as the summer villa for the well-to-do brewer of Sakura-Masamune sake, Tazaemon Yamamura, and is the only surviving Frank Lloyd Wright residence in Japan. The guest house was designed in 1918, and construction was completed in 1924.

Set into a hilltop in Ashiya, overlooking the Port of Kobe in western 
Japan, the villa demonstrates Wright's genius for spatial composition: although it has four 
levels, none is taller than two stories. By stepping the house into the hill, Wright took 
advantage of the extraordinary views of Osaka Bay the site offered. The exterior evokes Wright's Los Angeles textile block houses, but its decorative blocks are of Oya stone, not concrete.

In 1947, the house became the property of Yodogawa Steel Works, Ltd., and was used as an official residence for the company president. It was the first Taishō period building in Japan to be named an Important Cultural Property, in 1974. It was opened to the public as Yodokō Guest House in 1989. The building was damaged due to the Great Hanshin earthquake in 1995, but was subsequently repaired and has been re-opened.

References

External links

Official Site

Frank Lloyd Wright buildings
Houses completed in 1924
Important Cultural Properties of Japan
1924 establishments in Japan
Art Deco architecture in Japan